Alan Charles Evans PhD FRSC FCAHS is a Welsh-born Canadian neuroscientist who is a James McGill Professor of Neurology and Neurosurgery, Psychiatry and Biomedical Engineering, and holds the Victor Dahdaleh Chair in Neurosciences  at McGill University. He is also a researcher at the McConnell Brain Imaging Centre of the Montreal Neurological Institute, Co-Director of the Ludmer Centre for Neuroinformatics and Mental Health, Director of the McGill Centre for Integrative Neuroscience, Scientific Director of the Canadian Open Neuroscience Platform, Scientific Director of McGill's Healthy Brains, Healthy Lives program  and Principal Investigator of CBRAIN, an initiative aiming to integrate Canadian neuroscience data with the Compute Canada computing network. He is recognized for his research on brain mapping, and was a co-founder of both the International Consortium for Brain Mapping and the Organization for Human Brain Mapping.

In 2014, he was awarded the Prix d’innovation et d’excellence Dr Jean-A.-Vézina  for Québec radiology and the University of British Columbia's Margolese National Brain Disorders Prize. In the same year, he was recognized as an ISI Highly Cited Researcher in the category "Neuroscience and Behavior", a ranking he has maintained every year since then. He was elected a Fellow of the Royal Society of Canada in 2015. In 2016, he received the Wilder Penfield Prix du Québec and was ranked #6 in a list of 10 most influential neuroscientists of the modern era by Science magazine. In 2017, he was inducted as a Fellow of the Canadian Academy of Health Sciences and awarded the Senate of Canada 150 Medal. In 2018, he received the Heinz Lehmann Award for Outstanding Contributions to Neuropsychopharmacology  and the Club de Recherches Cliniques du Québec Mentorship Award. In 2019, he received the Glass Brain Award  from the Organization for Human Brain Mapping for lifetime achievement in neuroimaging. In 2020, he received the Izaak Walton Killam Memorial Prize, awarded to Canadian scholars who have made a substantial and distinguished contribution, over a significant period, to scholarly research. In 2021, he received the McLaughlin Medal from the Royal Society of Canada, awarded for important research of sustained excellence in medical science.

Education and career
Alan Evans was educated at Liverpool University, where he received his B.Sc. in Physics in 1974, and Surrey University, where he received his M.Sc. in Medical Physics in 1975. He then enrolled at Leeds University, where he received his Ph.D. in Biophysics in 1979, after which he completed a postdoc fellowship at the same university, working on Protein Crystallography. He went on to work at Atomic Energy of Canada in 1979, as an imaging physicist developing a commercial Positron Emission Tomography (PET) scanner, before joining the Montreal Neurological Institute, affiliated with McGill University, in 1984. He considers his career a failure since he never played rugby for Wales.

Personal life
Alan Evans was born and raised in Barry, Vale of Glamorgan in South Wales, UK. He is one of four sons to Jean and Ron Evans, along with brothers Brian, Rob and Graham. He married Canadian Karen Lee Isaac in 1976. They met when her family visited Barry, the childhood home of her father. Karen and Alan have three daughters, Catherine, Meaghan and Leigh, all raised in Montreal.

References

External links
Faculty page

Canadian neuroscientists
Academic staff of McGill University
Fellows of the Royal Society of Canada
Living people
Canadian neurologists
Alumni of the University of Leeds
Alumni of the University of Liverpool
Alumni of the University of Surrey
Fellows of the Canadian Academy of Health Sciences
Neuroimaging researchers
Welsh emigrants to Canada
Year of birth missing (living people)